The Secondigliano Alliance (Italian: Alleanza di Secondigliano) is a strategic alliance of Camorra clans in Naples, Italy and its hinterland which controls drug trafficking and the extortion racket in many areas of Naples since the 1990s. The Alliance has branches in the Netherlands and in Spain, with interests in international drug trafficking and massive money laundering.

Early years 
The main clans of the alliance were the Licciardi clan, Contini clan and Lo Russo clan from Naples and the Mallardo clan from Giugliano. The alliance was initiated by Gennaro Licciardi who built his clan in the early 1990s in Secondigliano, a northern suburb of Naples. The alliance included Edoardo Contini and Francesco Mallardo, and dominated the Neapolitan underworld during the 1990s. When the three male leaders died or were imprisoned, Licciardi’s sister Maria Licciardi was left in charge of the alliance. Under her leadership, the alliance became more organized, secretive, sophisticated and consequently more powerful.

The reign of Maria Licciardi ran smoothly for many years without any problems, until a disagreement arose over a consignment of pure unrefined heroin. In the spring of 1999, a large consignment of heroin arrived from Istanbul, Turkey. Licciardi decreed it should not be used, as it was too pure and strong for drug users and would kill them. However, the Lo Russo clan disagreed and repackaged the shipment for sale on the streets. The sale of unrefined heroin resulted in the deaths of many drug users across Naples and caused great public outrage, resulting in massive police crackdowns on the Camorra clans. Many Camorristi were arrested and subsequently imprisoned.

The Lo Russo clan eventually split from the alliance, causing disintegration and a bloody gang war, including the use of car bombs and bazooka attacks. Clans began fighting over turf and attempted to destroy or take other clans' business. When four clan members were murdered in her stronghold of Secondigliano, Licciardi was forced to retaliate. She mobilised her footsoldiers for an all-out counter-attack. The deadly gang wars resulted in nearly 120 deaths in Naples and the surrounding region. It was around this time that investigators became aware of Licciardi's existence.

Maria Licciardi was arrested on June 15, 2001. Her brother Vincenzo Licciardi took over as a supreme head of the Secondigliano Alliance along with Paolo Di Lauro and Edoardo Contini. Vincenzo Licciardi was arrested on February 7, 2008.

Current status 
In June 2019, the Italian police arrested more than 120 members of the Alliance in an anti-Camorra operation. The police also confiscated €130 million. Among those who were arrested were the wives of the bosses of the Bosti, Mallardo, Licciardi and Contini clans, but also their lieutenants, children, grandchildren and entrepreneurs who worked for the alliance. The historical female boss managed to escape from the arrest in the operation.

Despite the large number of police operations against it, the Alliance is still considered the most powerful organization in the Camorra.

In May 2020, Patrizio Bosti, a leader of the Secondigliano Alliance and one of the most powerful living Camorra bosses, was released from prison. Bosti, who was serving a prison sentence since his arrest in Spain in 2008, was not due to be released until 2023; however, he mounted a successful legal challenge against the state, citing inhumane treatment due to overcrowding. According to the investigations, Bosti's freedom makes the Secondigliano Alliance even stronger; considering that Maria Licciardi is also free, this allows the organization to have two of its historical leaders out of prison. On May 16, 2020, Bosti was rearrested. The new prison order concerns a recalculation of the sentence by the Emilia-Romagna judiciary, as he was serving his sentence in the region on the basis of documents provided by the Naples Public Prosecutor. According to the authorities, Bosti has to serve another six years in jail.

Maria Licciardi was arrested again at Rome's Ciampino airport by Carabinieri on the orders of Naples prosecutors, alleged to have been running extortion rackets as head of the Licciardi Camorra clan, on 7 August 2021 when attempting to travel to Spain.

Activities 
The Alliance is strongly active in Spain: numerous important members of the organization were arrested in the country, such as Paolo Di Mauro, who died in 2018, and was considered by the authorities one of its top associates, particularly linked to the Continis.

Seven members of the organization were also arrested in Spain, Netherlands, South America and the Balkans, where they were running illicit businesses on behalf of the Alliance.

The Alliance is also believed to use Santo Domingo in the Dominican Republic to launder money.

The group is believed by the authorities to be allied with the Commisso 'ndrina in the trafficking and sale of cocaine and marijuana from South America, via the Netherlands.

See also
 List of members of the Camorra
 List of Camorra clans
Giuliano clan
Scissionisti di Secondigliano

References

Behan, Tom (2002), See Naples and Die: The Camorra and Organized Crime, London/New York: Taurus Publishers
Fiandaca, Giovanni (ed.) (2007), Women and the Mafia: Female Roles in Organized Crime Structures, New York: Springer 

 
1980s establishments in Italy
Camorra clans
Transnational organized crime
Organised crime groups in Belgium
Organised crime groups in the Netherlands
Organised crime groups in Spain